Burning Lights is the seventh studio album by Chris Tomlin. It was released on January 8, 2013. The album includes studio renditions of songs previously recorded live on the Passion: White Flag album, including "Lay Me Down", "White Flag" and "Jesus, Son of God". The lead single, "Whom Shall I Fear (God of Angel Armies)", was released on November 9, 2012.

The album debuted at No. 1 on the Billboard 200 chart, becoming the fourth album from the contemporary Christian music genre to do so.

Background 

Chris Tomlin gave an interview to Worship Leader'''s Jeremy Armstrong and Armstrong asked Tomlin, "Your new record Burning Lights is a little bit of a shift for you in sound, obviously. So I wanted you to perhaps explain to people who are longtime listeners to your music, what might they hear that's a little bit different than what you've done in the past?"

 Theme 
Chris Tomlin was asked the question in the same interview with Worship Leader by Jeremy Armstrong that "What will always be in a Chris Tomlin record no matter how long your career lasts? What would you say will always be a part of what you do when you release something?"

 Critical reception Burning Lights was met with positive reception from the critics. James Christopher Monger of AllMusic rated the album four-out-of-five stars stating the album "stays true to the worship leader's penchant for crafting immaculately rendered slabs of inspirational modern rock that crib from Britpop, AOR rock, and folk, but they hardly sound phoned in." CCM Magazine also rated the album four-out-of-five stating that after "nine studio albums in, Chris Tomlin is still turning exciting new corners. Besides his artfully wound songrwriting the project includes compelling collaborations with Lecrae, Christy Nockels, Kari Jobe and Phil Wickham." Joshua Andre of Christian Music Zine rated Burning Lights four-point-five-out-of-five, stating that "Chris Tomlin has always impressed me with his offerings, but Burning Lights is on another level! This is seriously a great album and I am sure listeners will love the fresh melodies and different styles even if you aren't a Chris Tomlin fan..." In addition, Andre wrote that "...Burning Lights feels like the most 'complete' album of his career, if you could call it like that- I don't think I've ever been excited by a Chris Tomlin album ever." Tony Cummings of Cross Rhythms bestowed the album a perfect ten squares commenting on how "Tomlin is on a creative role and this, his 12th album, is his best yet."

Indie Vision Music was also positive, rating the album four-out-of-five-stars writing that "...Burning Lights is able to break the musical mould of simple worshipful tunes, mixing the tempos and musical arrangements up nicely". Louder Than the Music's Dave Wood gave it a perfect rating noting how Burning Lights "sets a new milestone on the worship song highway, breaking new ground with its mix of fresh relevant vibes and more established style of congregational worship. It's the ultimate modern worship album that will set the standard for what others will produce going forward". Kevin Davis of New Release Tuesday was superbly positive to the album and rated it a perfect five stars. He exclaimed that "Burning Lights is my new favorite overall album by Chris Tomlin...They are all instantly sing-able and worshipful arrangements that you'll want to add to your Sunday morning set-list. The themes of this album are Trusting God, loving Him and loving others as He loved us. All of the songs are catchy, exciting and worshipful. After listening to the album, I am stirred with compassion to love people as Jesus loves us." USA Today music critic Brian Mansfield rated the album three-out-of-four noting that if you "walk into any evangelical church on Sunday, and chances are the congregation will sing at least one Tomlin song. He'll add to their repertoire with these stirring melodies that tie him to both contemporary pop and hymns of old." Andrea Hunter of Worship Leader rated the album a perfect five stars stating that "Burning Lights is the quintessential representation of solid songwriting married to classic commercial pop recording."

Jesus Freak Hideout's Roger Gelwick and Alex "Tincan" Caldwell rated Burning Lights three-out-of-five stars in a somewhat negative review. Gelwick stated that while "there are refreshing changes that show Tomlin's willingness to venture into uncharted territory on occasion," the second half of the album was "a flickering disappointment in the end." Caldwell stated that while the "first six songs stands shoulder to shoulder with Tomlin's best known (and sung) songs", the second half of the album "is largely forgettable and stuffed with filler songs that even repeat melodies and lyrics from past albums."

Accolades
The album won the Praise and Worship Album category at the 44th GMA Dove Awards. It was also nominated for Best Contemporary Christian Music Album at the 56th Annual Grammy Awards.

 Commercial performance 
Burning Lights debuted at No. 1 on the Billboard 200, selling 73,000 copies. It was only the fourth Christian album to do so, and the second in less than a year, the previous being Eye on It by TobyMac. However the album dropped to No. 22 a week later, making it the 7th largest drop from #1 on the Billboard 200 as of January 2017.

The single "Whom Shall I Fear (God of Angel Armies)" (2012), charted as high as No. 1 on the Christian Songs chart and No. 15 on the Heatseekers Songs chart.

 Track listing 

 Personnel 
 Chris Tomlin – lead vocals (2-12), backing vocals (7)
 Jason Ingram – programming (1, 2, 5, 6, 8, 9), backing vocals (2, 5, 6, 9, 10, 12), acoustic piano (4)
 Dan Muckala – programming (2, 8)
 Ed Cash – keyboards (3, 4, 7), programming (3, 4, 7), acoustic guitars (3, 4, 7), mandolin (3, 4), bass (3), backing vocals (3, 4, 7), electric guitars (4), string arrangements (7)
 Matt Glider – keyboards (5, 6, 8, 9, 10), programming (6), acoustic piano (12)
 Jonathan Smith – programming (5, 9), bass (6), acoustic piano (11), electric guitars (11)
 Matt Stanfield – programming (5, 9)
 Nathan Nockels – acoustic piano (7), programming (7)
 Casey Brown – programming (10)
 Stu Garrard – guitars (1, 2)
 Adam Lester – guitars (2)
 Daniel Carson – electric guitars (3, 7), guitars (5, 6, 8, 9, 10, 12)
 Gabe Scott – dulcimer (5), additional guitars (6, 10)
 Chris Lacorte – electric guitars (7)
 Phil Wickham – acoustic guitars (11), lead and backing vocals (11)
 Joe Williams – electric guitars (11)
 Tony Lucido – bass (2, 5, 10)
 Jesse Reeves – bass (8, 9, 12)
 Paul Mabury – drums (2-8, 10, 11), programming (5, 6), percussion (7)
 Travis Nunn – drums (9, 12)
 Ray Butcher – trumpet (5)
 David Davidson – viola (7), violin (7)
 Chris Carmichael – strings (8)
 John Mark Painter – strings (12)
 Lecrae – spoken word (2)
 Scott Cash – backing vocals (7)
 Kari Jobe – harmony and backing vocals (7)
 Christy Nockels – lead and backing vocals (8)Gang vocals (Tracks 6, 8, 9 & 12) Casey Brown, Mia Fieldes, Stu Garrard, Daniella Mason, Natalie McDonald, Jonathan Smith and Chris YoungGang vocals (Track 11) Jason Ingram, Jonathan Smith, Chris Tomlin and Phil Wickham

 Production 
 Louie Giglio – executive producer
 Shelley Giglio – executive producer, art direction, management 
 Brad O'Donnell – executive producer
 Jason Ingram – producer (1, 2, 5, 6, 8-12)
 Dan Muckala – producer (2, 8), engineer (2)
 Jonathan Smith – assistant producer (1, 2, 5, 6, 8-12)
 Ed Cash – producer (3, 4, 7), engineer (3, 4, 7)
 Jim Dineen – engineer (1, 5, 6, 8, 9, 10, 12)
 Dave Salley – engineer (2, 11), additional engineer 
 Scott Cash – assistant engineer (3, 4, 7)
 Cody Norris – assistant engineer (3, 4, 7)
 Christian Paschall – additional engineer
 Joseph Williams – additional engineer
 Mark Zellmer – additional engineer
 Nathan Nockels – additional recording (7)
 Sean Moffitt – mixing (1)
 Mark Endert – mixing (2-12)
 Ted Jensen – mastering
 Lani Crump – production coordination (1, 2, 5, 6, 8-12)
 Dave Steunebrink – production coordination (1, 2, 5, 6, 8-12)
 Jess Chambers – A&R administration 
 Leighton Ching – art direction, design, additional photography
 Jan Cook – art direction
 Jeremy Cowart – artist photography
 Dan Duriscoe with U.S. National Park  Service – Milky Way images
 Mike McCloskey – managementStudios'''
 Recorded at White Cabin Studios (Atlanta, Georgia); Ed's (Franklin, Tennessee); Glomo Studio (Nashville, Tennessee).
 Additional recording at Glomo Studio, The Brown Owl and Fireside Studios (Nashville, Tennessee); Little Hollywood Hills (Franklin, Tennessee).
 Additional recording on Track 7 at Berwick Lane (Atlanta, Georgia).
 Mastered at Sterling Sound (New York City, New York).

Charts

Weekly charts

Year-end charts

Certifications

References 

2013 albums
Chris Tomlin albums